To is a literary work, whose Polish title could be translated to It,  by Czesław Miłosz. It was first published in 2000. 

2000 plays
Polish plays